Fairbanks-Morse, is a historic American (and Canadian) industrial scale manufacturer. It later diversified into pumps, engines and industrial supplies. One arm of the company is now a Diesel engine manufacturer located in Beloit, Wisconsin and has specialized in the manufacture of opposed-piston Diesel engines for United States Navy vessels and railroad locomotives since 1932. The diesel railroad locomotives the company produced are as follows:

Cab units

C-liners

Switchers

Road Switchers

References

See also

 Opposed-piston engine

 *
Fairbanks-Morse
Locomotives